Dynasty Warriors 2, known in Japan as , is a crowd-combat sequel to the fighting game Dynasty Warriors. It is the second game in the Dynasty Warriors series, but the first in the Shin Sangokumusō series. The game was released in other countries as Dynasty Warriors 2, leading to the discrepancy in title numbers. In North America and Europe it was released as a launch title for the PS2.

Gameplay
From this game onward, the player chooses a playable character general, and plays through a number of levels representing particular conflicts in the time of the three kingdoms, eventually defeating both of the other kingdoms and becoming the ruler of a unified China. However this game is not a one-on-one fighting game like the original Dynasty Warriors, but a beat 'em up hack and slash fighting game in full 3D, similar in genre to Fighting Force. Unlike previous games in the beat 'em up genre, Dynasty Warriors 2 allowed players the freedom to roam to any point within the limits of the current stage being played.

This game was the first to introduce Free Mode and Musou Mode to the series. The Free Mode allowed the player to replay any missions that they have already completed in Musou Mode.  The Musou Mode is the character's main story, where you play as the officer until the kingdom you are fighting for has unified China. However, due to the small scale of the game at the time, many important battles were missing. This was fixed in Dynasty Warriors 3, as many of the missing battles were added there.

Characters
There are a total of 28 characters.

* Denotes new characters to the series
Bold denotes default characters

Stages
Many of the stages are recreations of notable battles present historically or from the novel Romance of the Three Kingdoms, while original creations became more common with the newer installments. This is a list of stages in Dynasty Warriors 2.

Reception

The game received "generally favorable reviews" according to the review aggregation website Metacritic. Daniel Erickson of NextGen said of the game, "While it is the first third-person, 3D action game to feature a real-time battlefield, the gameplay is strictly old-school. Fun but not terribly deep." In Japan, Famitsu gave it a score of 31 out of 40.

Notes

References

External links
Koei's Official Site
Official Dynasty Warriors 2 Site 

2000 video games
Dynasty Warriors
PlayStation 2 games
PlayStation Network games
Koei games
Crowd-combat fighting games
Video games developed in Japan
Video games set in China
Video games based on Chinese mythology
Single-player video games